The 2011 Plymouth City Council election took place on 5 May 2011 to elect members to Plymouth City Council in England. One third of the council was up for election, in addition to a by-election, making twenty seats in total. The previous election produced a majority for the Conservative Party. The election resulted in Labour gaining 5 seats with Conservatives retaining control.

Background
Plymouth City Council held local elections on 5 May 2011 as part of the 2011 local elections. The council elects its councillors in thirds, with a third being up for election every year for three years, with no election in the fourth year. Councillors defending their seats in this election were previously elected in 2007. In that election, eleven Conservative candidates and eight Labour candidates were elected.

Ahead of this election, the Conservatives had controlled the council for four years, with the main opposition being the Labour Party.

Overall results 

|-
| colspan=2 style="text-align: right; margin-right: 1em" | Total
| style="text-align: right;" | 20
| colspan=5 |
| style="text-align: right;" | 69,715
| style="text-align: right;" | 

Note: All changes in vote share are in comparison to the corresponding 2007 election.

The Conservatives maintained their overall majority on the council, though reduced from six seats to two.

After the previous election, the composition of the council was:

Immediately before the election, the composition of the council was:

After this election, the composition of the council was:

Ward results

Budshead

Compton

Devonport

Drake

Efford and Lipson

Eggbuckland

Ham

Honicknowle

Moor View

Peverell

Plympton Erle

Plympton St Mary

Plymstock Dunstone

Plymstock Radford

St Budeax

St Peter and the Waterfront

Southway

Stoke

Sutton and Mount Gould

References

2011 English local elections
2011
2010s in Devon